Jacek Ziarkowski (born 23 January 1975 in Poland) is a Polish retired footballer.

References

Polish footballers
Living people
Association football forwards
1975 births
Odra Wodzisław Śląski players
Malatyaspor footballers
Dyskobolia Grodzisk Wielkopolski players
Górnik Zabrze players